Manuela Riegler  (born 15 June 1974) is an Austrian snowboarder.

She was born in Schwarzach im Pongau, and is a sister Claudia Riegler. She competed in women's parallel giant slalom at the 2002 Winter Olympics, and she competed at the 2006 Winter Olympics, in parallel giant slalom.

She won a silver medal in giant slalom at the FIS Snowboarding World Championships 1996, a silver medal in snowboard cross at the FIS Snowboarding World Championships 1997, a bronze medal in parallel giant slalom at the FIS Snowboarding World Championships 2001, and a gold medal in parallel giant slalom at the FIS Snowboarding World Championships 2005.

References

External links 
 

1974 births
Living people
People from St. Johann im Pongau District
Austrian female snowboarders
Olympic snowboarders of Austria
Snowboarders at the 2002 Winter Olympics
Snowboarders at the 2006 Winter Olympics
Sportspeople from Salzburg (state)